Gloria Leite de Paula (born June 10, 1995) is a Brazilian mixed martial artist currently competing in the strawweight division. A professional since 2017, she most notably fought in the Ultimate Fighting Championship (UFC).

Background
Daughter of photographers, she worked as a photo model from a young age. Glória was 17 years old and experiencing the pressure of being a third-year high school student when she started training muay thai with her mother to improve her physical conditioning. She liked it so much that she left the entrance exam in the background and started to take the sport more seriously.

The passion rose the first time she watched a UFC event from the stands. In August 2015, she tracked Ronda Rousey knocking out Bethe Correia in just 34 seconds and defending the UFC bantamweight belt. Glória left the event in Rio de Janeiro determined to become an MMA fighter.

Mixed martial arts career

Early career 
She currently holds a professional record of 5-2 with both of her losses coming to members of the UFC Arienne Carnelossi and Isabella de Padua by way of judges’ decisions.

Dana White's Contender Series
de Paula was initially scheduled to face Pauline Macias at Dana White's Contender Series 34 on November 3, 2020. However, de Paula tested positive for COVID-19 and the bout was rescheduled to take place at Dana White's Contender Series 36 on November 17, 2020. She won the fight via unanimous decision and was awarded a UFC contract.

Ultimate Fighting Championship
de Paula made her promotional debut against Jinh Yu Frey at UFC Fight Night 187 on March 13, 2021. She lost the fight by unanimous decision.

Gloria de Paula made her sophomore appearance against Cheyanne Vlismas at UFC on ESPN: Hall vs. Strickland on July 31, 2021. She lost the bout via first-round ground-and-pound technical knockout after she was knocked down by a head kick.

De Paula faced Diana Belbiţă on February 19, 2022 at UFC Fight Night: Walker vs. Hill. She won the fight via unanimous decision.

De Paula faced Maria Oliveira on June 18, 2022 at UFC on ESPN 37. She lost the bout via split decision. 7 out of 13  media scores gave it to De Paula.

On June 23, 2022, it was announced that De Paula was not re-signed and no longer on the UFC roster.

Invicta FC 
De Paula faced Karolina Wójcik on November 16, 2022 at Invicta FC 50 in the Strawweight tournament semifinal, losing via unanimous decision.

Personal life
De Paula is in a relationship with fellow mixed martial artist Mayra Bueno Silva.

Mixed martial arts record

|-
|Loss
|align=center|6–6
|Karolina Wójcik
|Decision (unanimous)
|Invicta FC 50
|
|align=center|3
|align=center|5:00
|Denver, Colorado, United States
|
|-
|Loss
|align=center|6–5
|Maria Oliveira
|Decision (split)
|UFC on ESPN: Kattar vs. Emmett
|
|align=center|3
|align=center|5:00
|Austin, Texas, United States
|
|-
|Win
| align=center| 6–4
|Diana Belbiţă
|Decision (unanimous)
|UFC Fight Night: Walker vs. Hill
|
|align=center|3
|align=center|5:00
|Las Vegas, Nevada, United States
|
|-
| Loss
| align=center| 5–4
| Cheyanne Vlismas
| TKO (head kick and punches)
| UFC on ESPN: Hall vs. Strickland
| 
| align=center| 1
| align=center| 1:00
| Las Vegas, Nevada, United States
| 
|-
| Loss
| align=center|5–3
| Jinh Yu Frey
| Decision (unanimous)
| UFC Fight Night: Edwards vs. Muhammad 
| 
| align=center|3
| align=center|5:00
| Las Vegas, Nevada, United States
|
|-
| Win
| align=center|5–2
| Pauline Macias
| Decision (unanimous)
| Dana White's Contender Series 36
| 
| align=center| 3
| align=center| 5:00
| Las Vegas, Nevada, United States
|
|-
| Win
| align=center|4–2
| Rafaela Rodrigues
| TKO (punches)
| Standout Fighting Tournament 16
| 
| align=center| 3
| align=center| 2:17
| São Paulo, Brazil
|
|-
| Loss
| align=center|3–2
| Isabela de Pádua
| Decision (unanimous)
| Standout Fighting Tournament 10
| 
| align=center| 3
| align=center| 5:00
| São Paulo, Brazil
|
|-
| Win
| align=center|3–1
| Bruna Vargas
| Decision (unanimous)
| MMA Experience 5 - Game Edition
| 
| align=center| 3
| align=center| 5:00
| São Paulo, Brazil
|
|-
| Win
| align=center|2–1
| Beatriz Gomes
| TKO (punches)
| Max Fight 20
| 
| align=center| 3
| align=center| 4:06
| São Paulo, Brazil
|
|-
| Loss
| align=center| 1–1
| Ariane Carnelossi
| Decision (unanimous)
| Thunder Fight 11
| 
| align=center|3
| align=center|5:00
| São Paulo, Brazil
| 
|-
| Win
| align=center| 1–0
| Thuany Valentim Fernandes
| TKO (punches)
| Batalha MMA 8
| 
| align=center| 1
| align=center| 4:59
| São Paulo, Brazil
|
|}

See also
 List of female mixed martial artists

References

External links
 
 

1995 births
Living people
Brazilian female mixed martial artists
LGBT mixed martial artists
Brazilian LGBT sportspeople
Strawweight mixed martial artists
Mixed martial artists utilizing Muay Thai
Brazilian Muay Thai practitioners
Female Muay Thai practitioners
Ultimate Fighting Championship female fighters
Sportspeople from Campinas